edpnet is a Belgian telco provider that offers internet, fiber and telephony for both the professional and consumer market in Belgium and the Netherlands.  Since 1999, the company established its name in the Belgian telecom market.  The company has its own fully redundant network.

Company headquarters are located in Sint-Niklaas, Belgium and a branch offices in Lelystad and in Saint-Petersburg, Russia.

Services 
The edpnet services include:

Connectivity:
 vdsl2 & fiber
 wavelengths
 MPLS
 IP transit
 sdh/sonet

Voice:
 Mobile
 VoIP
 Virtual PBX
 Voice trunks

Data center:
 shared server hosting
 virtual private server hosting	
 domain names

Other products and services:
 Hardware services

References

External links 
The Belgian edpnet homepage
The Dutch edpnet homepage

Internet service providers of Belgium